Original Gangstas: The Soundtrack is the original soundtrack to Larry Cohen's 1996 action film Original Gangstas. It was released on April 30, 1996 through Noo Trybe Records and consisted primarily of hip hop music. The album found decent success on the charts, peaking at number 41 on the Billboard 200 and number 8 on the Top R&B/Hip-Hop Albums, and featured two singles, "The World Is a Ghetto" and "Inner City Blues (Make Me Wanna Holler)".

Track listing

References

External links

1996 soundtrack albums
Action film soundtracks
Hip hop soundtracks
Virgin Records soundtracks
Albums produced by N.O. Joe
Albums produced by Havoc (musician)
Albums produced by Mike Dean (record producer)
Gangsta rap soundtracks